Fokino Urban Okrug is the name of several municipal formations in Russia. The following administrative divisions are incorporated as such:
Town of Fokino, Bryansk Oblast
Closed Administrative-Territorial Formation of Fokino, Primorsky Krai

See also
Fokino (disambiguation)

References